Loqueesha is a 2019 independent American comedy film written, produced, directed by, and starring indie comedian Jeremy Saville. The film tells the story of Joe, a middle-aged, divorced, white bartender who becomes a nationally syndicated radio host by impersonating a black woman.

The film attempted to cover many topics including racism, unemployment, income inequality, suicide, and African American tropes. The film's trailer was released on YouTube on May 11, 2019, prompting a backlash on social media for the film's perceived racism. Other reviewers considered the trailer to simply be a form of shock humor, used as a form of viral marketing. The film had a limited release in theaters on July 12, 2019, and was panned by critics and audiences, alike, and currently has a 0% rating on Rotten Tomatoes. It has since appeared on several lists of the worst films ever made.

Summary
After giving advice to a woman struggling with relationship problems, Joe is encouraged to audition for a local radio time slot. Joe hesitates to apply, but auditions in order to afford to send his son to a private gifted school. After getting rejected by the station, he resubmits an audition recording as Loqueesha, a no-nonsense sassy black woman, and becomes a national success.

Cast
 Jeremy Saville as Joe
 Susan Diol as Cindy
 Tiara Parker as Rachel
 Albie Selznick as George
 Mara Hall as Renee
 Dwayne Perkins as Mason
 Savannah Williams as Crystal
 Thaddeaus Ek as Jason
 Michael Madison as Ken
 Richard Milanesi as Bob
 Herb Mendelsohn as Fred
 Shaw Purnell as Joe's Mom
 Brad Banacka as Don
 Jay Costelo as Sean
 Alveraz Ricardez as Richard

Controversy
The film's trailer was released on YouTube on May 11, 2019, prompting a backlash on social media for the film's overt racism, sexism, stereotyping and cultural appropriation. In response, Saville tweeted a photograph of himself with Marlon Wayans, referencing the latter's film White Chicks; Wayans said, in return, that he "hated when people tag me in their bullshit. It is annoying as fuck". Dwayne Perkins, one of the black actors in the film, defended the film: "This is a comedy about a guy who does the wrong thing for the right reasons, and the movie really gets into all of it more than the trailer does... I think you have to withhold judgment until you see the movie, but again, making a mockery wasn't my intention".

Attempted submissions to film festivals 
Promotional material for Loqueesha stated that the film was an "official selection" of the San Luis Obispo International Film Festival (SLOIFF). A February 19 press release by SLOIFF listed Loqueesha in the festival lineup, but SLOIFF later tweeted that the film was never "selected, screened, or given an award at our festival." The film was originally submitted to the George Sidney Independent Film Competition but was rejected. Saville, a resident of Carmel, then submitted it to the "Central Coast Filmmakers Showcase", which is open to residents of Monterey, San Luis Obispo and Santa Barbara counties. After Loqueesha was accepted in this category and the festival guides had been printed, the film was pulled by its producers before the screening. The festival apologized that the film did not receive an adequate vetting process and committed to "installing appropriate measures to see that this unfortunate circumstance does not occur in the future.”

Reception 
Writing for The Guardian, reviewer Joel Golby criticized the quality of the cinematography, audio editing, casting, special effects, and plot of the film, concluding that Loqueesha was "the worst film ever made". Entertainment.ie found the concept of the film difficult to believe and based on the trailer called it "the worst movie of this decade". Cracked called it "Probably The Worst Movie of 2019". It was also on numerous "Worst Movies of the Last Decade" lists.

See also 
 List of films considered the worst
 List of films with a 0% rating on Rotten Tomatoes
 Soul Man, a 1986 film similar in content

References

External links 
 
 

2019 films
2019 controversies in the United States
2019 comedy films
African-American-related controversies
African-American-related controversies in film
Films about bartenders
Films about radio people
Films set in Detroit
American comedy films
American independent films
2019 independent films
Film controversies
Race-related controversies in film
Casting controversies in film
Ethnic humour
2010s English-language films
2010s American films